Aghmiyun Rural District is in the Central District of Sarab County, East Azerbaijan province, Iran. At the National Census of 2006, its population was 10,481 in 2,635 households. There were 10,456 inhabitants in 2,768 households at the following census of 2011. At the most recent census of 2016, the population of the rural district was 9,359 in 2,938 households. The largest of its 22 villages was Aghmiyun, with 1,234 people.

References 

Sarab County

Rural Districts of East Azerbaijan Province

Populated places in East Azerbaijan Province

Populated places in Sarab County